Monahans is a city in and the county seat of Ward County, Texas, United States. A very small portion of the city extends into Winkler County. The population was 6,953 at the 2010 census. In 2018, the population was estimated at 7,669.

History

The basin was formed during the Permian period, the final portion of the Paleozoic era. At the time, it was an ocean filled with abundant aquatic life.

In 1583, Spanish explorer Antonio de Espejo crossed this area on his way through present-day New Mexico. The Indians in the Monahans region were called vaqueros by these Spanish explorers because they hunted the "hump-backed cattle" or bison. Records of Spanish exploring the Los Medanos (the sand dunes) outside Monahans can be traced to the early 1770s.

Located in a region where native Comanches, Mescalero, and Lipan Apache Indians once roamed, Monahans' history as a community extends back to the late 1880s with the expansion of the Texas and Pacific Railway across the South Plains. For the few people living in West Texas, the building of a transcontinental railroad through the area meant the arrival of civilization. In the summer of 1881, Texas and Pacific Railroad contracted with surveyor John Thomas Monahan, who discovered that the lack of water for the laying crew and their animals would slow down construction of the rail. Monahan's digging of a water well produced an abundance of good water ( a day) and was instrumental in the success of the city. Prior to this solution, water had to be hauled to the area from Big Spring, Texas.

The availability of cheap land encouraged settlers to form a small community on the track known as Monahans Well. When oil was discovered in the area in 1926, though, the community changed directions. Oil discovery brought people of many occupations and of varied interests to Monahans. The local economy began to change from an agricultural to an industrial economy.

In June 1994, a temperature of 120 °F was recorded in Monahans, a still-standing record-holder for highest-ever Texan temperature.

Monahans Sandhills State Park

Thousands of tourists each year visit Monahans Sandhills State Park near Monahans. Sand surfing and sand football games can be seen year round, but particularly between March and November. Monahans Sandhills State Park is host to many family picnics and youth activities. The park is also a site for weddings.

Geography

Climate

Demographics

2020 census

As of the 2020 United States census, there were 7,836 people, 2,571 households, and 1,799 families residing in the city.

2000 census
As of the census of 2000, 6,821 people, 2,496 households, and 1,837 families were residing in the city. The population density was 274.9 people per square mile (106.2/km2). The 3,015 housing units averaged 121.5 per square mile (46.9/km2). The racial makeup of the city was 79.30% White, 5.16% African American, 0.35% Native American, 0.35% Asian, 12.55% from other races, and 2.29% from two or more races. Hispanics or Latinos of any race were 43.66% of the population.

Of the 2,496 households, 38.3% had children under the age of 18 living with them, 56.4% were married couples living together, 13.5% had a female householder with no husband present, and 26.4% were not families. About 24.3% of all households were made up of individuals, and 12.7% had someone living alone who was 65 years of age or older. The average household size was 2.68, and the average family size was 3.19.

In the city, the age distribution was 30.3% under 18, 8.2% from 18 to 24, 25.7% from 25 to 44, 21.5% from 45 to 64, and 14.3% who were 65 years of age or older. The median age was 36 years. For every 100 females, there were 93.1 males. For every 100 females age 18 and over, there were 89.4 males.

The median income for a household in the city was $30,349, and for a family was $36,726. Males had a median income of $31,307 versus $18,086 for females. The per capita income for the city was $14,100. About 14.7% of families and 16.5% of the population were below the poverty line, including 17.1% of those under age 18 and 18.1% of those age 65 or over.

In December 2015, the Seattle Post-Intelligencer voted Monahans fifth among the 10 "most conservative" cities in the United States in regard to campaign contributions. Other West Texas communities in the most conservative lineup are Hereford (first), Dalhart (fifth, tie), and Childress (9th). Princeton in Collin County north of Dallas ranked second.

Government and infrastructure
The Texas Department of Criminal Justice operates the Monahans District Parole Office in Monahans.

The United States Postal Service operates the Monahans Post Office.

Education
Public education in the city of Monahans is provided by the Monahans-Wickett-Pyote Independent School District.

All of Ward County and all of Winkler County are zoned to Odessa College.

Notable people

 Guy Clark, a songwriter and country musician, mentioned the city in his songs and in the 1997 live album Keepers during a musical interlude
 Dale Dudley, Texas Radio Hall of Fame member, host of Dudley and Bob Morning Show on KLBJ FM in Austin, spent part of his childhood in Monahans
 Deanna Dunagan, Tony Award-winning actress
 Edward Llewellyn, trumpet player
 Kathy Whitworth, a professional golfer in Texas Sports Hall of Fame and World Golf Hall of Fame, was born here
 Natalie Zea, an actress in the television series Justified, went to high school in Monahans

Transportation
The Texas-New Mexico Railroad operates a  branch line from a connection with the Union Pacific at Monahans. The branch line was constructed between 1928 and 1930 and terminates at Lovington, New Mexico.

Major highways

References

External links

City of Monahans – Official site
Monahans Chamber of Commerce
Monahans-Wicket-Pyote ISD Homepage

Cities in Texas
Cities in Ward County, Texas
Cities in Winkler County, Texas
County seats in Texas